Messler is an unincorporated community in Stoddard County, in the U.S. state of Missouri.

History
A post office called Messler was established in 1912, and remained in operation until 1939. The community has the name of W. P. Messler, original owner of the site. A variant spelling was "Mesler".

References

Unincorporated communities in Stoddard County, Missouri
Unincorporated communities in Missouri
1912 establishments in Missouri